Aḥmad ibn Yūsuf ibn al-Azraq al-Fāriqī was a chronicler from Mayyafariqin, present-day Silvan. His major work, Ta'rikh Mayyafariqin wa-Amid ("the history of Mayyafariqin and Amid"), is written in Arabic.

His ethnic origins aren't clearly known. Early in his life, ibn al-Azraq was a trading agent for the Artuqid ruler Husam al-Din Timurtash, son of Ilghazi. During one of his stays in Baghdad, c. 1140, he was educated by leading Muslim scholars for six months. From 1153 to 1154, he was at the court of King Demetrius I of Georgia, as his secretary. In his works, ibn al-Azraq specifically mentions the Christian king's benevolent treatment of Muslims. He was again in the Kingdom of Georgia in 1162 or 1163, before becoming mutaqalli ishraf al-waqf, that is, custodian of waqf (charitable endowment), in Mayyafariqin in 1166 or 1167. A year later, he served in the same position in Damascus for two years. He then returned to his native city. The year of his death is not certain. His work is a chronicle chiefly focused on Mayyafariqin and Amid in the Diyar Bakr region, but contains important details about the geography and history of the neighboring regions.

References 

1110s births
1170s deaths
People from Silvan, Turkey
12th-century historians of the medieval Islamic world